Henry Nicholson may refer to:

 Henry Alleyne Nicholson (1844–1899), British palaeontologist and zoologist
 Henry Nicholson (Royal Navy officer) (1835–1915)
 H. B. Nicholson (1925–2007), scholar of the Aztecs
 Henry Nicholson (cricketer) (1832–1858), English cricketer

See also
Nicholson (name)